Sherine Sayed Mohamed Abdel-Wahab (born October 8, 1980), known professionally by the mononym Sherine, is an Egyptian singer, actress, TV host and personality, and a former judge on MBC's The Voice: Ahla Sawt.

Early life
She was born on October 8, 1980, in Cairo, Egypt. She was born into a middle-class family, Her father is a decorator, and her mother, a housewife, and she has a brother and a sister.

As a child, Sherine's vocal talent was first discovered by her music teacher at school. At the age of nine, her teacher convinced her mother to take her to the Cairo Opera House to meet Selim Sahab, an Egyptian classical music conductor. She sang in front of him, and he liked her voice a lot. From the age of nine to the age of 12, she sang as a choral member at the Cairo Opera House, then she was given a chance to perform as a solo singer and had tremendous success. She kept singing at the Cairo Opera House while looking for a music producer to start her professional career. At the age of 18, she was introduced to Nasr Mahrous, a prominent starmaker, director and music producer, he liked her voice and decided to collaborate with her through the company, Free Music, where she met with Tamer Hosny, then a new talent seeking an opportunity too. Nasr Mahrous decided to make her debut as a joint album for both Tamer Hosny and Sherine included two duet songs showcasing them together. The album was released in September 2002, by the title Free Mix3 - Tamer & Sherine and was a big hit all across the entire Middle East and North Africa. The album sold more than 20 million copies across the whole Middle East and North Africa.

Cinema
Sherine starred opposite to Egypt's comedy star Ahmed Helmy in Mido Mashakel. The 2003 film was directed by Mohamed El-Naggar. In June 2015 she starred in the Ramadan Egyptian series Taree'i, where she played a young lady who struggles to achieve her lifelong dream of becoming a famous singer, against social restriction, regulations and opposition from her family. The drama is written by Tamer Habib and directed by Mohamed Shaker.

Programmes
Sherine was a judge on the show The Voice Ahla Sawt until her replacement in 2017.<ref>{{Cite news|url=http://www.standardrepublic.com/2017/07/guess-who-will-replace-sherine-in-the-voice-season-4/7204.htm|publisher=standardrepublic.com|title=Sherine - The Voice}}</ref>

In January 2017 she hosted  her own talk-show, Sherry's Studio, on the Egyptian network, DMC.

June 19, 2018 saw her and several celebrities and artists from around the world at the first ever concert in Saudi Arabia at King Abdullah Sports City in Jeddah, after the kingdom's new entertainment laws.

Personal life
Sherine married a second time on April 12, 2018 in Cairo, Egypt to Hossam Habib, an Egyptian pop singer. The wedding was attended by immediate family members, the managers and organizers of the couple, including Sherine's daughters from her previous marriage to Egyptian composer, Mohamed Moustafa. Sherine and Hossam Habib divorced in 2021.

Controversies
In 2017, a video recorded at a concert showed her responding to a song request by obviously joking that drinking from the Nile would give her schistosomiasis when she was asked to sing the song "Mashrebtesh Men Nilha" at a concert. The Egyptian Musicians Syndicate decided to suspend her right to perform in Egypt over her apparent "unjustified mockery of our dear Egypt" after viewing the video. Sherine later apologized for her "foolish joke" at the concert.

Discography
 Albums 
 Free Mix 3 with Tamer Hosny (2002) Label: Free Music Art Production
 Garh Tany (translation: Another Wound) (2003) Label: Free Music Art Production
 Lazem Ayesh (translation: I have to Live/Survive) (2005) Label: Free Music Art Production
 Batamenak (I'm Reassuring You) (2008) Label: Rotana
 Habeat (I Fell in Love) (2009) Label: Rotana
 Esaal Alaya (Ask About Me) (2012) Label: Rotana
 Ana Kiteer  (2014) Label: Nogoum Records
 Taree'i (2015)'''
 Nassay'' (2018)

Singles
 "Ma Sherebtesh Min Nelha"  (Popular Egyptian patriotic song)
 "Alachan Masr" ("For Egypt", Egyptian patriotic song)
 "Ma Btefrahsh" 
 "Enak" 
 "Baladi" ft. Muhammad Noor
 "Just A Dream (Coke Studio/Arabic Version) [with Nelly]
 "Al'am Al Jadeed" ft. Fadl Shaker 
 "Lebnan Fel Alb" (Dedicated for Lebanon during the war) 
 "Albi Leek" ft. Hany Shakir 
 "Bahibik Ya Omi"
 "Keda Ya Albi" 
 "Sida Da"
 "Kol Maghanni"
 "Ayesht Masr" (Egyptian patriotic song)
 "Ala Eidak" (2017)
 "Howa Dah" (2017)
 "Lawany" (2019)
 "Abo El Regala" (2019)
 "El Hob Khedaa" (2019)
 "Mesh Ad El Hawa" (2020)
 "Kollaha Ghayrana" (2021)
 "El Qamas" (2021)
 "Khasemt El Noum" (2021)
 "We Bahleflak" (2021)

Movie and television soundtracks
 "Balak" (2003)
 "Kteer Ben'shaa" (2006)
 "El Meraya" (2008)
 "Masha'er" (2013)
 "Halawat Al Dounia" (2017)
 "Ya Betfaker Ya Bet7es" (2019)
 "Weshy El Ha2i2i" (2021)

References

Living people
21st-century Egyptian women singers
Egyptian television actresses
Mass media people from Cairo
Actresses from Cairo
Egyptian film actresses
Singers from Cairo
Singers who perform in Classical Arabic
Singers who perform in Egyptian Arabic
1980 births